In Ohio, State Route 42 may refer to:
U.S. Route 42 in Ohio, the only Ohio highway numbered 42 since 1927
Ohio State Route 42 (1923-1927), now SR 95 (Marion to Fredericktown), US 36 (Mount Vernon to Coshocton), and SR 541 (Coshocton to near Kimbolton)

42